Wayne Erdman (born February 3, 1952, in Kitchener, Ontario) is a Canadian retired judoka who represented Canada in Judo at the 1976 Summer Olympics in Montreal, Quebec, Canada. He won the gold medal at the 1975 Pan American Games in the men's lightweight division (– 70 kg). Erdman holds the rank of 7th dan and is the chair of the Grading Board for Judo Ontario. He is also a certified Level 3 NCCP coach and a former National Coach. He is currently a senior sensei at the Kaizen Judo Club in Kitchener, Ontario, Canada.

See also
Judo in Ontario
Judo in Canada
List of Canadian judoka

References

External links
Kaizen Judo Club profile

1952 births
Living people
Canadian male judoka
Judoka at the 1975 Pan American Games
Judoka at the 1976 Summer Olympics
Lightweight judoka
Martial artists from Ontario
Olympic judoka of Canada
Sportspeople from Kitchener, Ontario
Pan American Games gold medalists for Canada
Pan American Games medalists in judo
Medalists at the 1975 Pan American Games
20th-century Canadian people
21st-century Canadian people